Ville Liukko (born 24 May 1974) is a former professional tennis player from Finland.

Career
Liukko began playing Davis Cup tennis for the Finnish team in 1994. By the time he made his last appearance in 2001, he had taken part in 15 ties. He won 19 of his 34 rubbers, 12 in singles and seven in doubles. His doubles partnership with Tuomas Ketola is the most successful in Finland Davis Cup history, securing six wins.

The Finn made it through qualifying at the 1999 US Open and faced Goran Ivanišević in the first round. He was beaten in four sets. In the Tashkent President's Cup later that year he defeated Marat Safin, then ranked 35th in the world. Safin retired hurt in the third set, trailing 3–1, with the match level at a set apiece. He also had a win over Thomas Johansson at the Copenhagen Open in 2000.

Challenger titles

Singles: (1)

Doubles: (1)

See also
List of Finland Davis Cup team representatives

References

1974 births
Living people
Sportspeople from Turku
Finnish male tennis players